Hocus Bogus is a 1976 novel by the French writer Romain Gary, published under the pseudonym Émile Ajar. The book was written after Paul Pavlowitch, the son of Gary's cousin, had been presented as the man behind the pseudonym Ajar. It asserts to tell the story of Pavlowitch's literary experiences from his own perspective, and comments on the recent success with The Life Before Us, the subsequent speculation that the author might be Gary, as well as explains his reclusiveness with the revelation that he has schizophrenia.

Reception
Michael Dirda reviewed the book in The Washington Post in 2010, and wrote that "In truth, Hocus Bogus is an utterly convincing impersonation of an artistically gifted schizophrenic, worthy to stand on the same shelf as Paul Ableman's classic I Hear Voices and Louis Wolfson's Le Schizo et les Langues." Dirda commented on how the book successfully had suppressed the rumours that Ajar was somebody else than Pavlowitch, and continued: "Nowadays, we can more fully appreciate the tour de force that Gary brings off[.] ... To read Hocus Bogus in Bellos's superb translation is to marvel at its dizzyingly distorted syntax ('I don't speak Danish, but not well enough'), constant wit ('reptiles are always first in the firing line when it comes to hate speech') and sheer energy."

See also
 1976 in literature
 20th-century French literature

References

1976 French novels
Novels by Romain Gary

Novels about writers
Works published under a pseudonym
Fictional portrayals of schizophrenia